Callicolaspis is a genus of leaf beetles in the subfamily Eumolpinae. It is known from South America. It was formerly considered a synonym of Lycaste Gistel, 1848, but in 2003 it was restored as a separate genus. Lycaste itself was later found to be an unnecessary replacement name for Chalcophana, and the name Eupetale was established for the species formerly placed under Lycaste.

Species
As of 2003, the genus is restricted to five species:
 Callicolaspis cuneiformis Bechyné, 1950
 Callicolaspis guignoti Bechyné, 1951
 Callicolaspis heros (Lefèvre, 1877)
 Callicolaspis munifica (Erichson, 1847)
 Callicolaspis ornata (Jacoby, 1903) (Synonym: Callicolaspis ellifranzaeana Bechyné, 1950)

References

Eumolpinae
Chrysomelidae genera
Beetles of South America